The Central Suriname Nature Reserve is a conservation unit in Suriname.
It preserves an area of tropical rainforest. The reserve is in pristine condition.

History

The Central Suriname Nature Reserve was created in 1998 by Conservation International and the government of Suriname from the fusion of three existing nature reserves: Ralleighvallen, Tafelberg and Eilerts de Haan gebergte. It was designated a UNESCO World Heritage Site in 2000 for its pristine tropical rainforest ecosystem.

The forest received material support from Microsoft co-founder Jeff Harbers.

Environment

The reserve is in the Guianan moist forests ecoregion.
It contains  of both montane and lowland primary tropical forest including sections of the Guyana Highlands.

It is known for its rapids and bird species, including the Guiana Cock of the Rock (Rupicola rupicola). Over 5,000 different plants have been identified, and large mammals like the jaguar, giant armadillo, and eight species of primates. A research station is located at the foot of Voltzberg and the area is tourist attraction.

Some of the most outstanding features in Central Suriname Nature Reserve are several granite domes – uplifted monoliths of granite rising high above the surrounding rainforest. Barren surface of dark-colored granite is exposed to impact of Sun thus creating unique xerophytic biotope which includes also endemic plant species. The best known granite dome is the 245 m high Voltzberg.

Other attractions include the Julianatop (1,230 m), the highest mountain in Suriname, the Tafelberg (Table Mountain, 1,026 meters), the Hendriktop (908 m), the Van Stockumberg (360 m), and Duivelsei (Devil's Egg), a rock seemingly balanced on the edge of a mountain.

The Eilerts de Haan Mountains are named for Johannes Gijsbert Willem Jacobus Eilerts de Haan, an explorer who died in Suriname's interior.

References

External links

UNESCO site: Central Suriname Nature Reserve
Conservation International site: Central Suriname Nature Reserve
Stinasu site: Central Suriname Nature Reserve

Nature reserves in Suriname
Sipaliwini District
Guayana Highlands
Protected areas established in 2000
World Heritage Sites in Suriname